René Weiler (born 13 September 1973) is a Swiss football coach and former player.

Playing career
Weiler started his career 1990 with FC Winterthur, the club of his hometown,  playing in the Challenge League. In 1992, he moved to FC Aarau who at the time were in the Swiss Super League. After only one season he changed sides with Servette FC, playing two seasons in Geneva and 41 games. From the 1996 season onwards, he played for FC Zürich for two seasons. He ended his career  with his youth club FC Winterthur from 1998 to 2001. He retired in 2001.

International career
Weiler played one game for the Swiss national team, a 2–1 defeat against Russia on 10 February 1997.

Coaching career

Winterthur
Weiler became an assistant coach for Winterthur on 1 March 2001. He was interim head coach from June 2001 to July 2001 and from January 2002 to February 2002.

St. Gallen
He was head coach of St. Gallen between 9 October 2007 and 28 October 2007.

Aarau
Weiler became head coach of Aarau on 13 April 2011. He left Aarau on 21 May 2014.

1. FC Nürnberg
Weiler became the new head coach of 1. FC Nürnberg on 12 November 2014.

RSC Anderlecht
He became the head coach of RSC Anderlecht on 1 July 2016. On 18 September 2017, he was sacked following a 3–0 away defeat to Bayern in the Champions League.

FC Luzern
He managed FC Luzern from 2018 to 2019.

Al Ahly
In 2019, he became the manager of Egyptian club Al Ahly. On 1 October 2020, Weiler departed Al Ahly after winning the Egyptian Premier League and Egyptian Super Cup.

Kashima Antlers

Managerial statistics

Honours

Club
Aarau
Swiss Challenge League: 2012–13
RSC Anderlecht 
Jupiler Pro League: 2016–17
Belgian Supercup: 2017
Al Ahly
Egyptian Premier League: 2019–20
Egyptian Super Cup: 2018

Individual 

 Belgian Professional Manager of the Year: 2016-17

References

1973 births
Living people
People from Winterthur
Association football defenders
Swiss football managers
Swiss expatriate football managers
Switzerland international footballers
Swiss men's footballers
FC Winterthur players
FC Aarau players
FC Winterthur managers
FC Aarau managers
Servette FC players
FC Zürich players
FC Schaffhausen managers
1. FC Nürnberg managers
R.S.C. Anderlecht managers
FC Luzern managers
Al Ahly SC managers
Expatriate football managers in Egypt
J1 League managers
Kashima Antlers managers
Expatriate football managers in Japan
Sportspeople from the canton of Zürich